The following is a timeline of the history of the city of Providence, Rhode Island, United States.

Prior to 19th century

 1635 – Great Colonial Hurricane of 1635
 1636 – Providence founded by Roger Williams a religious reformer.
 1638 – Baptist congregation formed.
 1643/44 - "Received a charter from the Parliamentary Government".
 1675 — Narragansetts "harass" white settlers as part of King Philip's War
 1676 — March 29: Narragansett warriors led by Canonchet burn about fifty houses, including Roger Williams' house, as part of King Philip's War
 1683 — Roger Williams dies
 1700 – North Burial Ground established
 1711 – First burial at North Burial Ground
 1743 - Beneficent Congregational Church congregation founded.
 1753 – Providence Library Company organized.
 1762
 State House built.
 William Goddard sets up printing press; Providence Gazette newspaper begins publication.
 1764 – College in the English Colony of Rhode Island and Providence Plantations established in Warren.
 1768 – Brick Schoolhouse built on Meeting Street.
 1770 – College in the English Colony of Rhode Island and Providence Plantations relocated to Providence.
 1774 - Rhode Island Supreme Court founded.
 1775 – Market House and First Baptist Meetinghouse built.
 1776 – 1777: Colonial and French troops use University Hall as a barracks and hospital during the American Revolutionary War
 1784 — January: Flooding on the Moshassuck River caused the greatest damage seen since the burning of the town during King Philip's War
 1785 – Beneficent Congregational Society established.
 1788
 John Brown House built.
 de Warville describes the town as "decayed".
 1789
 Providence Association of Mechanics and Manufacturers
 Providence Society for Abolishing the Slave-Trade established.
 1790
 U.S. Custom House established.
 Population: 6,380.
 1791 - October: Providence Bank on South Main Street incorporated; later known as Providence National Bank, Providence Union Bank and Trust Company, Industrial National Bank, and FleetBoston Financial.
 1793 - The first covered drawbridge is built over the Seekonk River where the Washington Bridge currently stands, followed the same year by the Central Bridge farther north.
 1794 – Serril Dodge opens his first jewelry store on North Main Street, thus beginning Providence's jewelry industry
 1795 – Theatre opens.
 1798 – Providence Marine Society established.

19th century

 1800 — Population: 7,614.
 1801
 January 21 — The first "Great Fire" destroys 37 buildings and leaves many families homeless
 Providence Marine Corps of Artillery founded.
 1802 – Providence Phoenix newspaper begins publication.
 1805 — Providence streets receive official names for the first time
 1810
 Cathedral of St. John built.
 Population: 10,071.
 1814 - Union Bank of Providence founded.
 1815 - September 23: The Great Gale of 1815 causes extensive damage and flooding.
 1816 - October 13: The First Congregational Church (Unitarian) dedicated, now known as First Unitarian Church.
 1818 – Rhode Island Peace Society and Merchants Bank established.
 1819
 New England Yearly Meeting Boarding School opens.
The Congdon Street Baptist Church is founded as the first independent Black church in the stat
 1820 - January 3: The Manufacturers' & Farmers' Journal, Providence & Pawtucket Advertiser begins publication, precursor to The Providence Journal.
 1822 - Rhode Island Historical Society founded.
 1823
 April — The first ordinance passed requiring snow removal from sidewalks within 24 hours after falling
 Providence Franklin Society incorporated.
 1824
 The first city directory issued
 Race riot in Hard Scrabble
 August 23 — Lafayette visited Providence for the first time since the Revolutionary War to great acclaim
 The Franklin Society a secret society based at Brown University founded. 
 1825 - May — the second "Great Fire" began at the corner of Union and Westminster Streets
 1828
 Dexter Asylum built.
 Westminster Arcade built.
 High Street Bank established.
 Herald newspaper begins publication.
 1829 - The Providence Journal newspaper begins publishing daily.
 1830 - "Providence had ceased to be a great port and had begun to be a textile manufacturing place". 
 1831
 Boston and Providence Railroad begins operating.
 Race riot in Snow Town.
 Gorham Silver and Franklin Lyceum established.
 1832
 City incorporated. City government meets at Market House
 Samuel W. Bridgham elected first mayor.
 1833 — David Brown opens a shop on South Main Street that later becomes Brown & Sharpe
 1835 – Train station and first India Point Railroad Bridge built.
 1836
 Providence Athenaeum formed.
 City hosts Rhode Island Anti-Slavery convention.
 1838
 Providence Association for the Benefit of Colored Children organized.
 Narragansett Boat Club organized.
 Solomon Pareira, first known Jewish resident of Providence, moves to the city from Holland
 1839 – Providence Marine Corps of Artillery armory built.
 1841/42 - Dorr Rebellion

 1843 – Classical High School established.
 1844
 Butler Hospital for the Insane founded. 
 Corliss, Nightingale & Co. in business.
 1845
 The City Council votes to prepare plans for a new City Hall
 Grace Church built.
 Laureldale Chemical Works established.
 1846
 Swan Point Cemetery established.
 Scholfield's Commercial College, a business college located downtown, established.
 A. T. Cross Company established.
 John Carter Brown Library established.
 1847
 Providence and Worcester Railroad begins operating
 Union Railroad Depot built
  Providence Tool Company established.
 1848
 Providence Medical Association instituted.
 B.B. and R. Knight, which later becomes Fruit of the Loom, established
 1850 – Providence Reform School opens.
 1852
 Central Congregational Church established.
 Locust Grove Cemetery incorporated.
 1853
 Providence Young Men's Christian Union established
 Joseph Brown teams with Lucian Sharpe to form Brown & Sharpe
 1854
 A cholera pandemic sweeps the city, especially among crowded immigrants and workers. Local cemeteries see record numbers of burials. For the next 30 years, 1854 is remembered as "The Year of Cholera." 
 Hartford, Providence and Fishkill Railroad begins operating.
 Sons of Israel, city's first Jewish congregation established
 1855
 James Y. Smith becomes mayor.
 Providence Aid Society organized.
 U.S. Customshouse built.
 1856 – Thomas Howland elected Warden of The Third Ward making him the first person of African heritage to hold office in the city
 1860 - Population: 50,666.
 1863
 Bryant and Stratton National Business College (now Bryant University) opens a campus in Providence
 Rhode Island Hospital founded.
 1865
 Rhode Island Locomotive Works produced 3,400 steam locomotives until closed in 1899.
 Population: 54,595.
 1866 - Providence receives state approval to tap the Pawtuxet River as a source of drinking water
 1867
 Young Women's Christian Association organized.
 Babcock & Wilcox founded.
 1868
 Rhode Island Hospital dedicated.
 Women's City Missionary Society organized.
 1869
Morning Star newspaper begins publication.
 November: Prospect Terrace Park created.
 "1870s" – A sewer system is constructed which discharges city waste into the harbor.
 1871
 Roger Williams Park donated to the people of Providence by Betsy Williams
 Thanksgiving Day: Providence municipal water service begins, pumping water from the Pawtuxet River
 Soldiers' and Sailors' Monument dedicated.
 1872
 Roger Williams Park & Roger Williams Park Zoo founded.
 First Universalist Church built.
 First Point Street Bridge built.
 Construction begins on the Brown and Sharpe Manufacturing Company Complex along the Woonasquatucket River
 Butler Exchange Building founded.
 1874 - Cornerstone of City Hall was laid on June 24.
 1876 – Rhode Island Women's Club established.
 1877
 Rhode Island School of Design and museum established.
 Providence County Court House dedicated.
 Grammar school built on Candace Street.
 1878
 Providence Grays baseball team formed; Messer Street Grounds baseball stadium built
 Cathedral of Saints Peter and Paul completed.
 Providence City Hall opens on November 14.
 Providence Public Library opens.
 Homeopathic Hospital founded.
 1880 – Providence Art Club incorporated.
 1881 - Sayles Memorial Hall built.
 1883
 Providence Press Club formed.
 Providence Literary Association organized.
 1884
 Providence Lying-In Hospital founded.
 Providence Camera Club organized.
 October: The Providence Grays win baseball's 1884 World Series championship game
 1885
 Fleur-de-lys Studios built
 Providence Grays baseball team disbanded
 The Providence Journal begins publishing seven days per week.
 1886
 June 9: Thomas A. Doyle dies in office, Providence's longest-serving mayor (18 years).
 June 14: Providence businesses shut down as Mayor Doyle's funeral procession marches through the city.
 1888 - City Hall was powered by electric lighting for the first time
 1890
 Providence's jewelry industry includes more than 200 firms with almost 7,000 workers
 Population: 132,146.
 1891
 Providence Athletic Association incorporated.
 The Outlet Company established.
 Providence News begins publication.
 1892
 Rhode Island College of Agriculture and the Mechanic Arts founded.
 First electric streetcar begins operation on January 20.
 1893 – New edifice for Central Congregational Church completed. 
 1894 – Providence Engineering Society founded.
 1896 – Providence Water Color Club organized.
 1897 – Emma Goldman arrested for "open-air speaking" at Market Square.
 1898 – Union Station rebuilt.
 1900
 Becomes the sole capital of Rhode Island.
 Population: 175,597.

20th century
 1901
 Providence's first sewage treatment plant begins "chemical precipitation" treatment of city waste, one of the first such plants in the US.
 Rhode Island State House built.
 1903 — Manchester Street Power Station constructed.
 1905
 Handicraft Club organized.
 Population: 198,635.
 1906 – Evening Tribune newspaper begins publication.
 1907 – Annmary Brown Memorial museum dedicated.
 1908 – Federal Building constructed.
 1909 - Lincoln Woods State Park founded.
 1910 – Population: 224,326.
 1913 - Turk's Head Building constructed
 1914 - Johnson & Wales School of Business was formed, later becomes known as Johnson & Wales University
 1915 — Population of "city proper:" 247,660 (census of 1915)
 1916 - June 3: 54,000 people march through downtown in a six and one-half hour parade in a show of support for Woodrow Wilson's war preparedness efforts.
 1917 - October 14: A Silent Parade is held by 1,800 African-Americans in Providence as part of a national protest against racial violence. The New York Age, a black newspaper, reported that "the marchers were accorded every courtesy by the large throngs of white people."
 1918
 September: the first cases of Spanish flu are reported early this month; by the end of the month, over 2,500 influenza cases filled city hospitals.
 October 6: The Board of Health issues a general closure order to combat the influenza outbreak.
 October 3–9: The influenza epidemic reaches its peak, with over 6,700 cases reported.
 October 25: The closure order is rescinded.
 December: A second influenza wave hits the city, though smaller than in October. No general closure is ordered.
 1919
 January: The second influenza wave sweeps through the city's school system.
 February 5: No new cases of influenza are reported, and the pandemic is declared over.
 1926 - Miriam Hospital opens.
 1928
 Construction finishes on the Industrial Trust Building (aka "Superman Building").
 February: Providence author H. P. Lovecraft publishes his most famous story The Call of Cthulhu in Weird Tales magazine
 Vedanta Society of Providence founded.
 1930 - 25 September: Current Washington Bridge south span opens
 1932 - Rhode Island Public Expenditure Council headquartered in city.
 1935 - Bryant College of Business Administration, now known as Bryant University, moves from downtown to the East Side
 1937 - March 15: Author H.P. Lovecraft dies, aged 47
 1938 – September: Hurricane.
 1945 – The Providence Journal wins its first Pulitzer Prize
 1949 – WJAR-TV begins broadcasting.
 1950 – Veterans Memorial Auditorium opens.
 1953 – The Providence Journal wins its second Pulitzer Prize
 1954 – Hurricane Carol strikes the area.
 1955 – WPRO-TV begins broadcasting.
 1956
Raymond L. S. Patriarca moves the New England organized crime family to Providence, setting up shop at a vending machine and pinball business on Federal Hill.
Providence Preservation Society organized.
 1957 – Dexter Asylum demolished.
 1958
 A one-mile section of Interstate 195 is completed in the Jewelry District; the highway is completed to the state line in 1960.
 Construction of Interstate 95 begins in Providence. Over the next few years, Interstates 95 and 195 will demolish large parts of several established neighborhoods, displace hundreds of homes and businesses, and leave the city split into several disconnected segments.
 1961 
 A District Master Plan known as "Downtown 1970" is issued by the city. Between 1965 and 1975, several city neighborhoods are razed by the Providence Redevelopment Authority.
 July: Construction on Fox Point Hurricane Barrier begun
 1962 – Brown Broadcasting Service established.
 1964 
 Westminster Street is converted to a pedestrianized mall, intended to compete with suburban indoor shopping malls.
 Once-grand Brown & Sharpe Manufacturing Company abandons its sprawling location along the Woonasquatucket River for a modern plant in North Kingstown.
 1966 – January: Fox Point Hurricane Barrier completed
 1968 – Rhode Island League of Cities and Towns headquartered in Providence.
 1969 – Current Henderson Bridge opens
 1971
 Bryant College vacates Providence for Smithfield
Desegregation of the Providence Public Schools
 1972 – Providence Zen Center founded.
 1974 — 'Interface: Providence' is released by a Rhode Island School of Design architecture class. This "visionary" and "radical" master plan departs from previous plans and focuses "not how to best to keep the Downtown alive, but rather how to repurpose its ruins" and influences future advocates for Downtown.
 1975
Buddy Cianci becomes mayor.
Eight thieves carry out the Bonded Vault heist, the largest heist and, subsequently, the longest and costliest trial in state history.
 1976 - November: Masjid Al-Karim, Islamic Center of Rhode Island, established.
 1978
 February: The Great Blizzard paralyzes Providence with nearly 28 inches of snow. Governor J. Joseph Garrahy comforts the city and state by wearing a flannel shirt.
 City Archives established.
 The city's jewelry industry peaks, with 32,500 workers, then begins a decline.
 1980
 Voters approve an $87 million bond issue to improve municipal sewage treatment plant
 The Narragansett Bay Commission was formed
 The Guinness Book of World Records names the Crawford Street Bridge the "widest in the world" at 1,147 feet.
 1984
 First Night Providence begins
 Mayor Buddy Cianci forced to resign after pleading "no contest" to an assault charge
 1986
 Providence Business News begins publication.
 Providence Station opens.
 1989 — The pedestrianized Westminster Mall is torn up and Westminster Street is re-opened to vehicular traffic.
 1990 – Governor Henry Lippitt House museum opens (approximate date).
 1991
 Buddy Cianci returns to the mayor's office
 Embezzlement at the Heritage Loan & Investment bank triggers the Rhode Island banking crisis.
 1994
 Waterplace Park constructed.
 WaterFire begins.
 Gun court established in the Providence Superior Court.
 1996 - The Providence Journal goes public and subsequently was purchased by the Dallas-based  A.H. Belo Company
 1997
 City website online (approximate date).
 Providence Children's Museum opens.
 1999
 Providence Urban Debate League founded.
 Providence Place Mall opens.

21st century
 2001 - April: Sitting mayor Buddy Cianci is indicted on federal criminal charges of racketeering, conspiracy, extortion, witness tampering, and mail fraud
 2002
 Soviet submarine K-77 museum opens
 September: Mayor Buddy Cianci is sentenced to serve five years in federal prison
 2003 – David Cicilline becomes mayor.
 2005 – January: The North American blizzard of 2005 drops 17 inches of snow on downtown Providence
 2006 – Haffenreffer Museum of Anthropology opens at Brown University.
 2007
 April 18: Soviet submarine K-77 sinks after a storm.
 May: Former mayor Cianci released from prison
 November: New Iway bridge opens for eastbound traffic
 2008 - Historic Westminster Arcade closes for renovations
 2009 - October: Final section of Iway bridge opens for westbound traffic.
 2010
 Population: 178,042.
 March: A series of rainstorms causes severe flood damage. President Obama declares a state of emergency for the region.
 2011
 January: Angel Taveras becomes mayor.
 August 28: Hurricane Irene downs 300-400 trees and leaves 12,700 without power.
 October: Occupy protest begins.
 November: Open Providence Commission for Transparency and Accountability established.
 2012 - October 29: Hurricane Sandy hits Providence. The Fox Point Hurricane Barrier is credited with saving the city from major damage.
 2013
 February: Winter Storm Nemo drops 27 inches of snow; Hurricane-force winds topple trees, and many people lose power
 Historic Westminster Arcade re-opens after renovation
 Historic Mayoral portraits in City Hall cleaned and restored
 April: The landmark Industrial Trust Building, aka "Superman Building," loses its sole tenant, and goes dark.
 2014 - October 17: The Phoenix publishes its last print issue
 2015
 January 5: Jorge Elorza sworn in as mayor
 January: Kennedy Plaza re-opens after major renovation
 September 20: George Redman Linear Park, a bicycle and pedestrian path on the Washington Bridge, was dedicated.
 2016
 January 28: Former mayor Buddy Cianci dies
 February 6–7: Former mayor Cianci lies in state at City Hall
 February 8: Cianci's funeral procession marches through the city, stopping for a funeral mass at the Cathedral of Saints Peter and Paul and ending at St. Ann's Cemetery in Cranston for burial.
 September 11: Mayor Elorza and the president of the firefighter's union come to an agreement after a 13-month contract dispute.
 2017 - November: Thousands lose power after Tropical Storm Philippe
 2018
 May: The Cable Car Cinema, an independent art cinema on South Main Street, closes its doors. The cinema had been in operation since the 1970s.
 September: Providence's first bicycle sharing program begins. 
 2019
 July 17: The Wexford Innovation Center opens. It is one of the first projects in the I-195 Redevelopment District.
 August: Providence's bicycle sharing program is suspended after widespread vandalism and criminal activity.
 August 9: The $21.9-million Providence River Pedestrian and Bicycle Bridge, built on footings which once carried I-195 across the Providence River, opens.
 2020
 January: Mayor Elorza introduces a Great Streets Initiative and Urban Trail Network Master Plan, a framework of public space improvements to encourage walking, riding bicycles, and public transit. 
 March: Due to the COVID-19 pandemic, all dine-in restaurants, bars, movie theaters, and all gatherings of 25 or more are banned in Providence and across the state by order of Governor Raimondo. This brings a halt to nearly all concerts, sports, and other events in the city. Providence public schools and the Providence Place Mall are closed. Providence College, Rhode Island College, Brown University, RISD, and Johnson and Wales suspend in-person classes and move to online instruction.
 May 30: Over a week of demonstrations begin as part of a nationwide series of Civil Rights protests. The  marches, attracting as many as 10,000, were called the "largest protest(s) in recent history," and were mostly peaceful, despite violence in other cities.
 June 2–6: A weeklong curfew is introduced by mayor Jorge Elorza in response to unrest after some early protests, then is rescinded early.
 July: Protesters calling to defund the police hold a series of protests and marches at the State House and Public Safety Complex. A civilian police oversight board is established to review police tactics.
 2021 - May 14: Eight people are shot and wounded (ninth victim wounded from glass shards) in Washington Park. The shooting was believed by authorities to have stemmed from conflict between two rival groups. It was the largest number of victims of any shooting in Providence history.

See also
 History of Providence, Rhode Island
 List of mayors of Providence, Rhode Island
 National Register of Historic Places listings in Providence, Rhode Island
 Timeline of Newport, Rhode Island

References

Bibliography

Published in the 19th century
 
 
 
 
 
  part 2
 
 
 
 
 

Published in the 20th century
 
 
 
 
 
  (describes Providence)
 
 
 

Published in the 21st century

External links

 
 Works related to Providence, various dates (via Digital Public Library of America).
 
 Map of Providence, 1904

Years in Rhode Island
 
Providence
providence